Prajin Padmanabhan is an Indian actor concentrating in Tamil and Malayalam-language films. He started his career as a VJ with Sun TV. He played the protagonist in the film Pazhaya Vannarapettai.

Film career

Prajin started his career in films with Dishyum followed by Saboothiri. He had the lead role in Manal Nagaram, a Tamil-Malayalam bi-lingual based at U.A.E. directed by Oru Thalai Ragam Shankar. Now he is doing a Tamil movie Engeyum Naan Eruppen Direct by Benny Thomas And Scprit by Nakamaneci and produced by Asrif Perungadi. He is described as the most desirable man on television in the year 2017.

Filmography

Films

Television

References

External links 
 

Male actors from Kozhikode
21st-century Indian male actors
Male actors in Tamil cinema
Living people
Male actors in Malayalam cinema
Indian male film actors
1978 births
Indian male television actors
Tamil male television actors